Auguste Magdalene of Hesse-Darmstadt (6 March 1657, Darmstadt – 1 September 1674, Darmstadt) was a German noblewoman and poet.

Life 
Auguste Magdalene was a daughter of Count Louis VI of Hesse-Darmstadt (1630–1678) from his marriage to Maria Elisabeth of Holstein-Gottorp (1634–1665), a daughter of Duke Frederick III of Holstein-Gottorp.

Like her father and her sister Magdalene Sibylle, she was active as a writer.  She translated the Psalms of David into German verse and wrote a poetry collection entitled The door to German poetry. She died only 17 years old and was buried in the City Church in Darmstadt.

References 
 Gustav Friedrich Klemm: The Women, p. 281 (in German)
 Georg Gottfried Gervinus: poetical history of the German national literature, p. 280 (in German)

House of Hesse-Darmstadt
1657 births
1674 deaths
17th-century German women writers
17th-century German poets
17th-century German translators
German women poets
Writers from Darmstadt
Daughters of monarchs